Chabula acamasalis is a moth of the family Crambidae. It is found in India, Burma, Sri Lanka, Hong Kong, Indonesia, Taiwan, Japan and much of Australia.

The wingspan is about 20 mm. The wings are dark brown with a pattern of white patches.

References

Moths described in 1859
Spilomelinae